Lifestyles of the Ramones is a VHS video made by the Ramones featuring interviews and music videos. Later, it was released again on DVD includes extras such as "Photo Gallery" & "Discography" - with Portuguese Brazilian subtitle, plus English lyrics for each song, and in 2005, it was re-released and included as a bonus disc of the 4 Disc Box-Set "Weird Tales Of The Ramones", and plus some music videos from 1992 to 1996, especially the unseen video 'Blitzkrieg Bop (Fast Live Version 1991)', 'Substitute' (1993 MTV Banned Version) and 'Spiderman' (1992 Cartoon Version).

Music videos including in the film

 "Do You Remember Rock 'n' Roll Radio?" (Directed by Mark Robinson, 1980)
 "Rock 'n' Roll High School" (Directed by Mark Robinson, 1980)
 "We Want the Airwaves" (Directed by Maureen Nappi, Craig Leibner & Kirk Heflin, 1981)
 "Psycho Therapy" (Directed by Frances Delia, 1983)
 "Time Has Come Today" (Directed by Schiro/Demyan, 1983)
 "Howlin' At The Moon (Sha-La-La)" (Directed by Frances Delia, 1984)
 "Something to Believe In" (Directed by Fischer & Preachman, 1987)
 "I Wanna Live" (Directed by Fischer & Preachman, 1987)
 "I Wanna Be Sedated" (Directed by Bill Fishman, 1988)
 "Pet Sematary" (Directed by Bill Fishman, 1989)
 "Merry Christmas (I Don't Want to Fight Tonight)" (Directed by George Seminara, 1989)
 "I Believe in Miracles" (Directed by George Seminara, 1990)
 End Credits - Background music "Ramones-On-45 Mega-Mix!"

People who were interviewed in this video 

 Ramones
 Talking Heads
 Family members
 New York Disc Jockeys
 Anthrax
 Daniel Rey
 Ed Stasium
 Dave Righetti
 Debbie Harry
 Little Steven
 Chris Isaak
 Jean Beauvoir

External links

Ramones video albums
1991 video albums
1991 compilation albums
Music video compilation albums
Ramones compilation albums